Zinc finger protein 770 is a protein that in humans is encoded by the ZNF770 gene.

References

Further reading 

Human proteins